Rüdiger Reiche (born 27 March 1955) is a retired German rower and a 1976 Olympic champion in the quadruple sculls. Between 1974 and 1985 he won eight medals in single, double and quadruple scull events at the world championships, including two gold medals. After retiring from competitions he worked as a rowing coach at the club and national levels, training Daniel Haudoerfer and Hubert Trzybinski.

References 

1955 births
Living people
People from Querfurt
People from Bezirk Halle
East German male rowers
Sportspeople from Saxony-Anhalt
Olympic rowers of East Germany
Rowers at the 1976 Summer Olympics
Olympic medalists in rowing
World Rowing Championships medalists for East Germany
Olympic gold medalists for East Germany
Medalists at the 1976 Summer Olympics
Recipients of the Patriotic Order of Merit in silver